The Rambler Badge is an award of the Rovers section of Scouts Canada. It is one of the few Rover merit badges, and the highest non-yearly award a Rover can receive. Rovers can receive multiple Rambler Badges over time. The award is, and has been, used by the Rover sections of other Scout associations.

See also
List of highest awards in Scouting

References

Scout and Guide awards
Scouting and Guiding in Canada